Qeshlaq-e Charkhlu (also Romanized as Qeshlāq-e Charkhlū and Qeshlāq-e Jerkhlū; also known as Qeshlāq and Qishlāq) is a village in Ebrahimabad Rural District, Ramand District, Buin Zahra County, Qazvin Province, Iran. At the 2006 census, its population was 1,180, in 271 families.

References 

Populated places in Buin Zahra County